p-Phenylenediamine (PPD) is an organic compound with the formula C6H4(NH2)2. This derivative of aniline is a white solid, but samples can darken due to air oxidation. It is mainly used as a component of engineering polymers and composites like kevlar. It is also an ingredient in hair dyes and is occasionally used as a substitute for henna.

Production
PPD is produced via three routes.  Most commonly, 4-nitrochlorobenzene is treated with ammonia and the resulting 4-nitroaniline is then hydrogenated:
ClC6H4NO2  +  2 NH3   →   H2NC6H4NO2  +  NH4Cl
H2NC6H4NO2  +  3 H2   →   H2NC6H4NH2  +  2 H2O

In the DuPont route, aniline is converted to diphenyltriazine, which is then converted by acid-catalysis to 4-aminoazobenzene. Hydrogenation of the latter affords PPD.

Uses

Precursor to polymers
PPD is a precursor to aramid plastics and fibers such as Kevlar and Twaron. These applications exploit PPD's difunctionality, i.e. the presence of two amines which allow the molecules to be strung together. This polymer arises from the reaction of PPD and terephthaloyl chloride.  The reaction of PPD with phosgene gives the diisocyanate, a precursor to urethane polymers.

Dyeing
This compound is a common hair dye. Its use is being supplanted by other aniline analogues and derivatives such as 2,5-diamino(hydroxyethylbenzene and 2,5-diaminotoluene). Other popular derivatives include tetraaminopyrimidine and indoanilines and indophenols. Derivatives of diaminopyrazole give both red and violet colours.  In these applications, the nearly colourless dye precursor oxidizes to the dye.

Rubber antioxidant
PPD is easily oxidized, and for this reason, derivatives of PPD are used as antiozonants in the production of rubber products (e.g., IPPD). The substituents (naphthyl, isopropyl, etc.) affect the effectiveness of their antioxidant roles as well as their properties as skin irritants.

Other uses
A substituted form of PPD sold under the name CD-4 is also used as a developing agent in the C-41 color photographic film development process, reacting with the silver grains in the film and creating the colored dyes that form the image.

PPD is also used as a Henna surrogate for temporary tattoos. Its usage can lead to severe contact dermatitis.

PPD is also used as a histological stain for lipids such as myelin.

PPD is used by Lichenologists in the PD test to aid identification of Lichens.
PPD is used extensively as a cross-linking agent in the formation of COFs (covalent organic frameworks), which have a number of applications in dyes and aromatic compounds adsorption.

Safety 
The aquatic  of PPD is 0.028 mg/L.  The U.S. Environmental Protection Agency reported that in rats and mice chronically exposed to PPD in their diet, it simply depressed body weights, and no other clinical signs of toxicity were observed in several studies. One review of 31 English-language articles published between January 1992 and February 2005 that investigated the association between personal hair dye use and cancer as identified through the PubMed search engine found "at least one well-designed study with detailed exposure assessment" that observed associations between personal hair dye use and non-Hodgkin's lymphoma, multiple myeloma, acute leukemia, and bladder cancer, but those associations were not consistently observed across studies. A formal meta-analysis was not possible due to the heterogeneity of the exposure assessment across the studies.

In 2005–06, it was the tenth-most-prevalent allergen in patch tests (5.0%).

The CDC lists PPD as being a contact allergen. Exposure routes are through inhalation, skin absorption, ingestion, and skin and/or eye contact. Symptoms of exposure to PPD include throat irritation (pharynx and larynx), bronchial asthma, and sensitization dermatitis. Sensitization is a lifelong issue, which may lead to active sensitization to products, including but not limited to black clothing, various inks, hair dye, dyed fur, dyed leather, and certain photographic products. It was voted Allergen of the Year in 2006 by the American Contact Dermatitis Society.

Poisoning by PPD is rare in western countries.

See also
 Henna

References

Anilines
Diamines
Monomers